Diarmuid Mac Muireadhaigh, sometimes known in English as Dermot McMurray, was an Irish poet, alive in the late 17th century.

Biography

Mac Muireadhaigh is believed to be the composer of a 23 verse poem in honour of Gordon O'Neill, an officer who fought for the army of King James II during the Jacobite War in Ireland. It is typically known by its opening line of "Gluaisigh ribh a ghlac rannsa ...". The poem is described by Paul Walsh as being "addressed to him [O'Neill] before the stirring times of his last years in Ireland", suggesting that it was written sometime in the 1680s.

No other details of Mac Muireadhaigh appear to be known, although a man of his surname was killed in action at the Battle of Aughrim in 1691, and was grandfather of Séamus Mór Mac Mhurchaidh, poet and outlaw, who was executed in 1750.

Poem

The first four verses of the Gluaisigh ribh a ghlac rannsa poem commence as:

References

Irish poets
Irish-language poets
17th-century Irish people
People from County Armagh